Tosari is a village in the Tengger Mountains of East Java, Indonesia. It is near Pasuruan and is on a route to nearby Mount Bromo. The Tosari Sanitorium was advertised in a 1919 brochure.

Gallery

See also
Bromo Tengger Semeru National Park

References

Tosari
Tosari